is a 1991 Japan-exclusive Family Computer Formula One video game developed by Human Entertainment and published by Varie. It is the sequel to Nakajima Satoru: F-1 Hero, and is based on the 1991 Formula One season. There are 16 rounds and only four cars to choose from.

Image

References

1991 video games
Formula One video games
Human Entertainment games
Japan-exclusive video games
Nintendo Entertainment System games
Nintendo Entertainment System-only games
Racing video games
Satoru Nakajima video games
Varie games
Video game sequels
Video games developed in Japan
Video games set in 1991